The Volvo Tundra was a concept car that was built and designed by Bertone in 1979 and was based on the Volvo 343. The angular design was by Marcello Gandini. It was rejected by Volvo, who thought it was too modern and difficult to sell.

Bertone instead sold a very similar design to Citroën, where it was produced as the Citroën BX from 1982 to 1994. 

The Tundra's rear-side window had a pulled-down top edge, an idea that was continued on the BX C Pillar. The effect was of a floating roof, a design idea that would become popular in the 2010s. 

The car featured a digital speedometer and was powered by a 1.4-litre, four-cylinder engine, giving .

References 

Tundra
Cars introduced in 1979